Köhnəkənd or Kyohnak’end or Këgnakend or Këkhnekend may refer to:
 Köhnəkənd, Gadabay, Azerbaijan
 Köhnəkənd, Lachin, Azerbaijan